Justin Thomas Chaston (born 4 November 1968 in Cardiff) is a retired Welsh athlete who specialised in the 3000 metres steeplechase. He represented Great Britain at three consecutive Summer Olympics starting in 1996.

His personal best in the event is 8:23.90 from 1994.

Competition record

References

1968 births
Living people
Sportspeople from Cardiff
Welsh male steeplechase runners
Welsh male long-distance runners
British male steeplechase runners
Commonwealth Games competitors for Wales
Athletes (track and field) at the 1994 Commonwealth Games
Olympic athletes of Great Britain
Athletes (track and field) at the 1996 Summer Olympics
Athletes (track and field) at the 2000 Summer Olympics
Athletes (track and field) at the 2004 Summer Olympics
World Athletics Championships athletes for Great Britain
Competitors at the 1994 Goodwill Games